Annette Rid (née Schulz-Baldes) is a bioethicist and physician-scientist specialized in research ethics, global health ethics, and justice in health and health care. She works at the National Institutes of Health Clinical Center.

Education 
Rid graduated from University of Freiburg with a B.A. (2002) in philosophy and history, a M.D. (2003), and a Ph.D. (2004) in physiology, summa cum laude. In 2013, she completed a habilitation in biomedical ethics at the University of Zurich.

Career 
Rid was a senior lecturer and then reader in bioethics and society in the department of global health and social medicine at the King's College London from October 2012 to August 2018. She was an assistant research professor in the Kennedy Institute of Ethics from September 2018 to March 2019.

Rid is a bioethicist at the National Institutes of Health Clinical Center. She serves as a liaison between the NIH Clinical Center's Department of Bioethics and the Division of AIDS at the National Institute of Allergy and Infectious Diseases, where she provides ethics consultation and educational support. She is also a Visiting Professor at the Department of Global Health and Social Medicine, King's College London. Rid's research interests include research ethics, global health ethics, and justice in health and health care.

Awards and honors 
She was elected fellow of The Hastings Center in 2016.

References

External links 
 
 

Year of birth missing (living people)
Place of birth missing (living people)
Living people
21st-century women scientists
21st-century women physicians
Physician-scientists
Bioethicists
Hastings Center Fellows
University of Freiburg alumni
University of Zurich alumni
Georgetown University faculty
Academics of King's College London
National Institutes of Health people